The men's super-G competition of the Sochi 2014 Olympics was held at the Rosa Khutor Alpine Resort, near Krasnaya Polyana, Russia, on Sunday, 16 February.

Kjetil Jansrud of Norway won the gold medal and Andrew Weibrecht of the United States took the silver. Two bronze medals were awarded for the third-place tie between Jan Hudec of Canada and Bode Miller of the U.S.

Jansrud's win was the fourth straight in this event for Norway, following Kjetil André Aamodt (2002, 2006) and Aksel Lund Svindal (2010).

Results
The race was started at 10:00 local time, (UTC+4).

References

External links
FIS-Ski.com – 2014 Winter Olympics – Men's Super G
Results

Super-G